Ally Sloper was a Thoroughbred racehorse noted for winning the 1915 Grand National.

A five-year-old owned by Lady Margaret Nelson and trained by Aubrey Hastings, it was ridden by Mr Jack Anthony. Carrying 10 st 5 lb, Ally Sloper won the race by two lengths at a price of 100/8 and in a time of 9 min 47.8 s. It was  Aubrey Hastings' second national winner having won the race in 1906 with Ascetics Silver. It was also the first Grand National winner to be owned by a woman.

Pedigree

References

Grand National winners
National Hunt racehorses
Racehorses bred in the United Kingdom
1909 racehorse births
Thoroughbred family 5-d